Vexillum (Costellaria) militare is a species of small sea snail, marine gastropod mollusk in the family Costellariidae, the ribbed miters.

Description
The shell size varies between 5 mm and 20 mm. The shell is somewhat fusiform in shape, decreasing in size at its base. The spire tapers to a slender point, its sutures (parts dividing one whorl from another) are deep and ribbed lengthwise. The shell has interstices crosswise deeply lineated, crosswise and its ribs are blunt. The upper whorls are yellow, while the last whorl is encircled in crimson red. Its columella (central column) is four plaited.

Distribution
This species is distributed in the Western Pacific Ocean.

References

 Turner H. 2001. Katalog der Familie Costellariidae Macdonald, 1860. Conchbooks. 1-100 page(s): 44

External links
 
 Reeve, L. A. (1844-1845). Monograph of the genus Mitra. In: Conchologia Iconica, or, illustrations of the shells of molluscous animals, vol. 2, pl. 1-39 and unpaginated text. L. Reeve & Co., London.
  Cernohorsky, Walter Oliver. The Mitridae of Fiji; The veliger vol. 8 (1965)

militare
Gastropods described in 1845